The Cincinnati Leopards soccer club was a founding member of the W-League, based in Cincinnati, Ohio. The team folded after the 1995 season.

Year-by-year

Defunct USL W-League (1995–2015) teams
Soccer clubs in Ohio
Leo
Women's soccer clubs in the United States
1995 disestablishments in Ohio
1995 establishments in Ohio
Association football clubs established in 1995
Association football clubs disestablished in 1995
Women's sports in Ohio